The 2019 World Rugby Under 20 Championship was the twelfth edition of the premier age-grade competition for rugby. The tournament was held in Argentina for the second time, having been hosted there in 2010.

Defending champions France won the under 20 title again in 2019, defeating Australia in a closely fought final by 24–23 at the Racecourse Stadium in Rosario. The city of Santa Fe also hosted matches in the 2019 championship.

Teams
The teams that participated in the tournament are listed in the table below, with a summary of their previous best results at the World Rugby Under 20 Championship included.

Pool stage
The pool stage fixture was as follows:

Pool A
{| class="wikitable" style="text-align: center;"
|-
!width="200"|Team
!width="20"|Pld
!width="20"|W
!width="20"|D
!width="20"|L
!width="20"|PF
!width="20"|PA
!width="32"|−/+
!width="20"|TF
!width="20"|TA
!width="20"|BP
!width="20"|Pts
|- style="background:#ccffcc;
|align=left| 
| 3 || 2 || 0 || 1 ||113 || 70 || +43 || 15 ||  8 || 3 || 11
|- style="background:#ccffcc;
|align=left| 
| 3 || 2 || 0 || 1 || 94 || 80 || +14 || 13 ||  9 || 3 || 11
|-   
|align=left| 
| 3 || 2 || 0 || 1 || 87 || 85 ||  +2 || 10 || 11 || 1 || 9
|-  
|align=left| 
| 3 || 0 || 0 || 3 || 62 ||121 || −59 ||  8 || 18 || 1 || 1
|}

Pool B
{| class="wikitable" style="text-align: center;"
|-
!width="200"|Team
!width="20"|Pld
!width="20"|W
!width="20"|D
!width="20"|L
!width="20"|PF
!width="20"|PA
!width="32"|−/+
!width="20"|TF
!width="20"|TA
!width="20"|BP
!width="20"|Pts
|- style="background:#ccffcc;
| align="left" | 
| 3 || 2 || 0 || 1 || 114 || 85 || +29 || 16 || 12 || 3 ||11
|-  
| align="left" | 
| 3 || 2 || 0 || 1 ||  97 || 85 || +12 || 13 || 11 || 2 ||10
|-
| align="left" | 
| 3 || 2 || 0 || 1 || 106 || 98 ||  +8 || 14 || 14 || 1 || 9
|-  
| align="left" | 
| 3 || 0 || 0 || 3 ||  49 || 98 || −49 ||  7 || 13 || 1 || 1
|}

Pool C
{| class="wikitable" style="text-align: center;"
|-
!width="200"|Team
!width="20"|Pld
!width="20"|W
!width="20"|D
!width="20"|L
!width="20"|PF
!width="20"|PA
!width="32"|−/+
!width="20"|TF
!width="20"|TA
!width="20"|BP
!width="20"|Pts
|- style="background:#ccffcc;
|align=left| 
| 3 || 3 || 0 || 0 || 116 ||  56 || +60 || 18 || 8 || 2 || 14
|-  
|align=left| 
| 3 || 2 || 0 || 1 || 114 ||  71 || +43 || 17 || 8 || 2 || 10
|- style=
|align=left| 
| 3 || 1 || 0 || 2 ||  50 || 105 || −55 || 6 || 17 || 0 || 4
|-  
|align=left| 
| 3 || 0 || 0 || 3 ||  64 || 112 || −48 || 10 || 16 || 2 || 2
|}

Pool stage standings
Seedings for the knockout stage based on results from the pool stage:

Knockout stage

9–12th place play-offs

Semi-finals

11th place

9th place

5–8th place play-offs

Semi-finals

7th place

5th place

Finals

Semi-finals

3rd place

Final

Statistics
Statistics for the 2019 championship:

Final placings

References

External links
 Official website

World Rugby Under 20 Championship
World Rugby Under 20 Championship
World Rugby Under 20 Championship
World Rugby Under 20 Championship
World Rugby Under 20 Championship